Ahmed Ashraf Al-Fiqi (born 31 December 1992)  is a Saudi Arabian professional footballer who plays as a winger for Al-Faisaly.

Club career
Ahmed Ashraf started playing as an amateur in the Al-Shalhoub Academy in Riyadh. He represented the Saudi Arabia national football team in the 2017 Gulf Cup of Nations after foreign players who were born in Saudi Arabia were allowed to represent the national team. On 10 January 2018, Ashraf signed his first professional contract, an 18 months contract, with Pro League champions Al-Hilal. On 27 December 2018, he renewed his contract with Al-Hilal for 2-years. On 22 August 2019, Ashraf joined Al-Faisaly on a one-year loan from Al-Hilal. On 25 October, Ashraf joined Al-Faisaly on a permanent deal.

Career statistics

Club

Honours

Club
Al-Hilal
Saudi Professional League: 2017–18
Saudi Super Cup: 2018

Al-Faisaly
King Cup: 2020–21

References

External links
 
 

1992 births
Living people
Saudi Arabian footballers
Saudi Arabia international footballers
Association football wingers
Al Hilal SFC players
Al-Faisaly FC players
Saudi Professional League players
Naturalised citizens of Saudi Arabia